Uchitel (Russian or Ukrainian: учитель) means  teacher in Russian and Ukrainian languages and may refer to:
 Uchitel Publishing House, Russian publishers
 Alexei Uchitel (born 1951), Russian film director
 Rachel Uchitel (born 1975), American nightclub hostess